I See You is a 2006 Indian romantic comedy film directed by Vivek Agrawal and produced by Mehr Jesia. The film stars Arjun Rampal and introducing Vipasha Agarwal. Chunky Pandey, Sonali Kulkarni, Sophie Chaudhary, Boman Irani and Kirron Kher are featured in supporting roles. The film was released on 29 December 2006. It was filmed in London. The film is based on the novel If Only It Were True (Et si c'était vrai...) by Marc Levy.  It also has elements from the Malayalam film Vismayathumbathu, and from the 2005 American film Just Like Heaven, which were both also based on the same novel.

Plot 
Raj Jaiswal (Arjun Rampal) is the TV host of his own talk show, British Raj and is also a notorious womanizer. He promises to marry every woman he flirts with, however, secretly, he has sworn to stay a bachelor forever. One day, he meets a mysterious woman, Shivani Dutt (Vipasha Agarwal) on his balcony who claims that his apartment is actually hers. Raj is instantly smitten with her. However, it turns out that he is the only one who can see her and touch her. To everyone else, it seems as if he talks to himself and is slowly going mental. His friends tell Raj to let go, but Raj refuses, as he has fallen in love with the ghost woman. He finds out that Shivani is actually lying in a hospital in a coma, and her life support is about to be cut off. Raj decides to save her and brings her comatose body to his apartment to look after it.  Shivani's doctor wants to kill her as she has witnessed an illegal operation where a kidney was removed and the doctor wants to save himself. Shivani finally admits that she has fallen in love with Raj, but Inspector Smith is on his trail and finally finds out what happened to Shivani's body - and also discovers the doctor's organ trafficking. Soon afterward, Shivani awakens from her coma and doesn't remember Raj or the time she has spent with him as a ghost at all. Raj, disappointed, leaves her at the hospital and decides to get to know her anew: he finds her at a restaurant and introduces himself.

Cast 
 Arjun Rampal as Raj Jaiswal
 Hrithik Roshan (Cameo in the song Subah Subah)
 Shahrukh Khan (Cameo in the song Subah Subah)
 Vipasha Agarwal as Shivani Dutt
 Chunky Pandey as Akshay Kapoor
 Boman Irani as Dr. Omi Patnaik
 Kirron Kher as Mrs. Dutt
 Sonali Kulkarni as Kuljeet
 Sophie Chaudhary as Dilnaaz Bagga
 Michael Maloney as Inspector Johnny Smith
 Hilary Hodsman as Florist Michelle

Soundtrack 

All songs are composed by Vishal–Shekhar and lyrics are penned by Vishal Dadlani

Reception
Priyanka Jain of Rediff.com gave the film 2.5 out of 5, stating "I See You is watchable, as long as you do not expect anything much from it." Poonam Joshi of BBC.com wrote "With such lacklustre performances, the end product is amateurish and tedious. I See You could well leave you in much the same state as its lead character. Comatose." Taran Adarsh of Bollywood Hungama stated "On the whole, I SEE YOU could've been an interesting fare, but is letdown by a lopsided screenplay. At the box-office, the lack of face-value and an inopportune release period [people don't like to spend New Year in a cinema hall] will only add to its woes."

References

External links
 
 

2006 films
2000s Hindi-language films
Films shot in London
Films scored by Vishal–Shekhar
Hindi remakes of Malayalam films
Films based on French novels